Punta Penna Lighthouse is an active lighthouse in Vasto, Italy. At a height of  it is the eighth tallest "traditional lighthouse" in the world, and the second tallest lighthouse in Italy after the Lantern of Genoa. It is located on strategically important spot in Via Madonna della Penna at the port of Vasto.

History
Built in 1906, it has repeatedly been the subject of reconstruction. In 1944, the retreating German army destroyed part of the old lighthouse and it was demolished. Reconstruction started in 1946 to the design of architect Olindo Tarcione; it reopened on 2 May 1948.

The lighthouse is unusual as it looks like a regular brick building with a two-story base which provided housing for the light keeper family and also houses some administrative offices.

A spiral staircase of 307 steps leads up to the summit.

See also
 List of tallest lighthouses in the world
 List of lighthouses in Italy

Notes

References

 as "Punta della Penna".

External links

 Servizio Fari Marina Militare 

Lighthouses completed in 1906
Lighthouses completed in 1948
Lighthouses in Italy
Buildings and structures in Abruzzo
1906 establishments in Italy